The Timișoara metropolitan area is a metropolitan area in Timiș County, which includes Timișoara and 14 surrounding communes. It was legally established in 2008 as an inter-community development association and is a member of the Federation of Metropolitan Areas and Urban Agglomerations in Romania (FZMAUR).

History 
The first attempts to create a metropolitan area appeared in 1999–2000, when Timișoara and six peri-urban communes in the first ring surrounding the city (Dumbrăvița, Ghiroda, Giroc, Moșnița Nouă, Săcălaz and Sânmihaiu Român) entered into a local partnership. The result of this partnership was the elaboration of a medium- and long-term "strategic concept of economic and social development". In 2004, by a decision of the Timiș County Council, the first Metropolitan Consultative Council was established.

The delimitation of the area of influence was approved by HCL no. 387/2008.

Geography 
The total area on which the Timișoara metropolitan area extends is 1,079.54 km2 – of which 129.27 km2 represent the administrative territory of Timișoara, and 950.27 km2 the area of influence of the city – occupying about 3.4% of the West development region and about 12.5% of Timiș County.

Administration 
The Timișoara metropolitan area is administered by the Timișoara Growth Pole Intercommunity Development Association, led by a General Assembly, a Board of Directors and a General Manager. The General Assembly is the supreme governing body, composed of all members of the Association. The president of the Association is the mayor of Timișoara. The total number of representatives in the General Assembly is 31 members. The Board of Directors is the executive governing body of the Association, composed of the president of the Association and two members appointed by the General Assembly for a period of two years.

Subdivisions 
The Timișoara metropolitan area includes an urban center (Timișoara) and its area of influence, i.e. 14 communes (Becicherecu Mic, Bucovăț, Dudeștii Noi, Dumbrăvița, Ghiroda, Giarmata, Giroc, Moșnița Nouă, Orțișoara, Pișchia, Remetea Mare, Săcălaz, Sânmihaiu Român and Șag) with 35 villages.

Given the accentuated polarization of the area and the continuous expansion of Timișoara and its suburbs, it was proposed to extend the metropolitan area with the following subdivisions:
 in the south – the communes of Liebling, Parța, Pădureni and Sacoșu Turcesc (possibly also Peciu Nou);
 in the east – the commune of Chevereșu Mare and the town of Recaș (possibly also the communes of Racovița and Topolovățu Mare and the town of Buziaș);
 in the north – the communes of Bogda, Fibiș and Sânandrei (possibly also Mașloc);
 in the west – the communes of Biled and Satchinez.

Demographics 
According to the 2011 census, the resident population of the Timișoara metropolitan area was 387,604, 5.3% higher than previously reported in the 2002 census. The population of the metropolitan area represents 21.2% of the population of the West development region and 56.26% of the population of Timiș County. The majority of the population (82.38%) lives in Timișoara (319,279) and only 17.62% in the area of influence (68,325), given that the area of Timișoara represents about 12% of the area of the metropolitan area. The population growth was more pronounced in the peri-urban countryside than in Timișoara, the share of the city in the total population of the area decreasing by almost 4% between 2002–2011. In its extended area of influence, defined as the area that can be reached within a 60-minute drive from the city proper, live about 950,000 people.

Economy 
Timișoara polarizes over 80% of the county's turnover and over 30% of the region's.

The city's economic profile, largely based on manufacturing, has encouraged the expansion of urban mass toward the larger metropolitan area. If between 1992–2012 Timișoara expanded by 13%, the metropolitan area expanded by about 18%. Some of the peri-urban localities have undergone a dramatic process of transformation. For example, during this period, Dumbrăvița expanded by 138%. Other localities expanded by 20%, 30% or 50%.

The area of influence has a mixed functional profile, generally dominated by the service sector. The villages in the immediate vicinity of the city – Ghiroda, Remetea Mare, Giroc – crossed or delimited by major roads (E70) and the villages in the vicinity of well-defined industrial areas of the city (Sânmihaiu Român) have micro-industrial areas, the industrial units located here having significant shares in the turnover of the locality (over 40%, even over 50% in the case of Giroc). In general, agriculture plays a minor role in the functional profile of the area of influence.

References 

Metropolitan areas of Romania
Geography of Timiș County